KSSJ-LD, virtual channel 47 (UHF digital channel 33), is a low-powered television station licensed to San Antonio, Texas, United States. The station is owned by DTV America.

History 
The station's construction permit was initially issued as K59EY on September 9, 1992. When channels 52 through 59 were designated out of core, K59EY moved to channel 42 as K42GJ on December 7, 2006. On July 7, 2010, the callsign changed to KSSJ-LP. The current KSSJ-LD calls were assigned on January 11, 2016.

Digital channels
The station's digital signal is multiplexed:

References

External links
DTV America 

Low-power television stations in the United States
Innovate Corp.
SSJ-LD
Television channels and stations established in 2020
2020 establishments in Texas